Nakaoka (written: 中岡) is a Japanese surname. Notable people with the surname include:

, Japanese women's footballer
, Japanese samurai

Japanese-language surnames